Valenzuela piceus is a species of Psocoptera in Caeciliusidae family that can be found in the United Kingdom, and sometimes Ireland. It are also common in countries like Austria, Belgium, Bulgaria, Croatia, Denmark, Finland, France, Germany, Greece, Hungary, Italy, Latvia, Luxembourg, Norway, Poland, Romania, Spain, Sweden, Switzerland, and the Netherlands. The species is light brown coloured.

Habitat
The species feeds on haystacks and riverside reeds.

References

Caeciliusidae
Insects described in 1882
Psocoptera of Europe
Taxa named by Hermann Julius Kolbe